Devil's Gun is the debut studio album recorded by American disco group C. J. & Company, released in 1977 on the Westbound label.

Chart performance
The album peaked at No. 12 on the R&B albums chart. It also reached No. 60 on the Billboard 200. The album features the title track, which peaked at No. 2 on the Hot Soul Singles chart and No. 36 on the Billboard Hot 100, and "We Got Our Own Thing", which charted at No. 93 on the Hot Soul Singles chart . Both tracks, along with the track "Sure Can't Go to the Moon", peaked at No. 1 on the Hot Dance/Disco chart.

Track listing

Personnel
C.J. & Company
Cornelius Brown, Jr.
Joni Tolbert
Connie Durden
Curtis Durden
Charles Clark

Additional Musicians/Personnel
Uriel Jones, Tiki Fulwood – drums
Rudy Robinson, Earl Van Dyke – piano
Greg Coles, Roderick Chandler – bass
Bruce Nazarian, Robert White – guitar
Dennis Coffey – guitar solo
Larry Nozero – flute solo
Gary Schunk – moog synthesizer solo
Mike Theodore – horns and strings arrangement

Charts

Singles

References

External links
 

1977 debut albums
Albums produced by Dennis Coffey
Westbound Records albums